Miranda Tatari Šimunović (born 20 September 1983) is a Croatian handball player. She plays on the Croatian national team, and participated at the 2011 World Women's Handball Championship in Brazil.

References

External links

1983 births
Living people
Croatian female handball players
Olympic handball players of Croatia
Handball players at the 2012 Summer Olympics
Sportspeople from Koprivnica
Croatian people of Kosovan descent
Croatian people of Albanian descent
RK Podravka Koprivnica players